Charles David "Charley" Manring (August 18, 1929 – August 7, 1991) was an American competition rower and Olympic champion, and later naval officer. Born in Cleveland, Ohio, he won a gold medal in coxed eights at the 1952 Summer Olympics, as coxswain for the American team.

References

1929 births
1991 deaths
Rowers at the 1952 Summer Olympics
Olympic gold medalists for the United States in rowing
American male rowers
Medalists at the 1952 Summer Olympics
Sportspeople from Cleveland
Coxswains (rowing)